Leonid Khabarov (born May 8, 1947) is a former Soviet military officer whose battalion was the first Soviet Army unit to cross the border into the Democratic Republic of Afghanistan on December 25, 1979, serving as the de facto beginning of the decade-long Soviet–Afghan War. He received widespread media attention after he was arrested on charges of fomenting a coup d'état while serving as a Russian ROTC chief in 2011. He was accused of having created a master plot to overthrow local authorities in the Ural region of Russia for the purpose of launching a nationwide rebellion.

The indictment accused Khabarov of attempting to illegally purchase weapons "in an undetermined place, in undetermined circumstances, acting in conjunction with undetermined individuals." Trial sessions were routinely rescheduled, but on 26 February 2013 the Sverdlovsk Regional Court sentenced Khabarov to four-and-a-half years in prison, despite nationwide protest. Khabarov appealed to the Supreme Court of Russia, but his case was rejected. On 2 July 2014 he was released on parole.

Early years 

Khabarov was born to a military family in Shadrinsk, Kurgan Oblast, on 8 May 1947. His father, Vasily Khabarov, was a Red Army officer and World War II veteran who died from battle injuries soon after Khabarov was born. His mother moved to Nizhny Tagil, where Khabarov successfully finished evening school and then vocational school, having received a work qualification. He then worked for a year as an excavator operator in the Tagil industrial area.

In addition to working and studying, he also participated in amateur boxing, winning several local championships. When he became eligible for conscription, Khabarov planned to attend a military aviation school, but was rejected due to a nasal fracture acquired during his boxing career. Instead, Khabarov was permitted to join the Russian Airborne Troops.

Although it was possible for a civilian to enroll directly in the airborne school without having served as a conscript, Khabarov decided to voluntarily complete his mandatory military service first. During a training jump, he received a spinal injury, but this did not prevent him from continuing his service. After three years as a conscript, Khabarov began attending the airborne school at Ryazan, leaving the enlisted ranks as a Sergeant.

Military career

First command

After successfully graduating from the airborne school, Khabarov was assigned to the 100th Separate Reconnaissance Company as their commanding officer. As CO, he insisted on an exhausting training regime for his troops, conducting training missions in the Taklamakan Desert and climbing the Pamir peaks, one of which was named "VDV Peak" as a result. After two years in command of the Company, during which it twice won the Soviet Airborne Troops Team Championship, Khabarov (then a Senior Lieutenant) was chosen by Soviet military officials to be the protagonist of Skies on the Shoulders, a Soviet Armed Forces half-hour promotional video that aired in 1975 across the Soviet Union, and was particularly successful with conscription-eligible youths.

For several years he served as a military celebrity, appearing on the front page of  Pravda several times. Vasily Margelov, Commander-in-Chief of the Soviet Airborne Troops, noted during large-scale military exercises that "[Khabarov] has great prospects". Margelov insisted that Khabarov attend the Vystrel Higher Military Courses in Moscow and, following his graduation, had him assigned to the 105th Guards Airborne Division in Chirchik as a battalion commander.

Deployment to Afghanistan

Invasion

At 12:00 AM on 25 December 1979, Khabarov led his battalion across the border between Uzbekistan and Afghanistan as part of the wider Soviet invasion; it was the first unit to cross the border, along with the 154th Separate Spetsnaz Detachment. Khabarov and his men quickly advanced through Mazar-i-Sharif, Kunduz, and Puli Khumri, covering 279 miles in less than eighteen hours in temperatures of –22 °F. They seized the Salang Pass, a strategic location on the way to Kabul, and successfully repelled several counter-attacks over the following three months.
The first attack on Khabarov's garrison, successfully repelled in a matter of hours, left 80 mujahideen dead, and nearly 150 wounded. Despite the harsh weather conditions, frequent blizzards, stormy wind, and mujahideen activity, there were no Soviet casualties during that time.

Yuri Tukharinov, then Commander of the Soviet Forces in Afghanistan, later noted that despite almost all of the land-transported Soviet troops crossing the Salang Pass, and all of them hearing his name, Tukharinov himself had never met Khabarov in person. Instead, he heard Khabarov via radio transmissions, leading to Khabarov appearing to be a hero from ancient sagas -  a mythical King in the mountain. He was amazed to finally meet Khabarov and find him to be nothing more than a thin redheaded everyman in his 30s.

After a few months spent defending the Salang, Khabarov and his men were dispatched to Kunduz Province, engaging in several military operations. They were then called back to Kabul, under the direct order of Tukharinov. The Afghani resistance had intensified its insurgency, blowing up bridges, springing ambushes in deep ravines, and setting up heavy machine-guns in caves.

Panjshir offensive 

In March 1980, Khabarov received an order to prepare his troops for a major offensive in Panjshir Province, a stronghold of the mujahideen. Located between Jabal-ul-Siraj and Charikar, Khabarov's battalion was ordered to move through the Panjshir Valley to the very end of it and back to lure out and confront the resistance and their leader, Ahmad Shah Massoud. Massoud ordered his mujahideen to mine the only road in the valley. While proceeding with the mission, Khabarov's troops covered the distance from Kabul to Shahimardan, Fergana Province, Uzbekistan, defeating several rebel groups, and seizing documentation of the Afghan National Islamic Committee, including portfolios on all rebel leaders and detailed plans.

On 13 April 1980, Khabarov and his battalion, in cooperation with units of the Afghan National Army, confronted a large group of Mujahadeen fighters. After killing several of them and being wounded by both Type 56 assault rifles (including one shot to the head, which his helmet absorbed), he was hit by a .50 caliber round that crippled his right hand, leaving him unable to fight or use the radio. Despite this, he continued to command his troops via the battalion's radioman until a helicopter arrived to evacuate casualties. Khabarov ordered the most badly wounded to be evacuated first, expecting there to be no place left for him but, despite his protestations, he was loaded aboard the helicopter by his subordinates.

Delivered to Kabuli military hospital, he nearly had his hand amputated by medical interns before a patron, Colonel General Yuri Maximov, intervened. Maximov released that handicapping one of his most prominent soldiers would affect troop morale and cause negative publicity in the USSR. He had expert surgeons operate on Khabarov, saving his life and hand. He was soon transferred to Tashkent, and then to Burdenko General Military Clinical Hospital in Moscow, where he began physical rehabilitation.

Second deployment to Afghanistan 
While recovering, he was promoted to Major, graduated from Frunze Military Academy and assigned to command a mechanised infantry regiment located near the Afghan border. Knowing his own dislike of serving as an infantry commander, Khabarov accepted a demotion from Regiment Commander to Chief-of-Staff for a brigade in order to transfer back to the 56th Air Assault Brigade. He spent 11 months with his brigade from October 1984 to September 1985, when the supply convoy he was escorting was ambushed near Barikot. His vehicle was hit by an RPG, turning it upside down, and Khabarov was left with a broken collarbone, three fractured ribs and further injuries to his right hand. He was again treated in Kabul and at Tashkent military hospital. As he recovered, then President Mikhail Gorbachev signed the Geneva Accords, leading to the Soviet withdrawal from Afghanistan in 1989. Khabarov, saw this act as a direct betrayal of the friendly Afghani government headed by the pro-Soviet President Mohammad Najibullah.

Staff positions 

Having recovered from his injuries, Khabarov was assigned to a staff position at the Carpathian Military District, quartered in Lviv, Ukraine. He was given a large apartment in the city, along with a quiet office job. He later described his life in Lviv as idyllic, and his work the equivalent of “fraying pants”.

In 1991 he celebrated 25 years of the active duty service and Khabarov faced retirement age. He could retire earlier, using the option of a medical discharge due to the severity of suffered injuries. However, he decided not to go on pension, and asked his superiors for a chance to remain in service. The high-ranking airborne officer Georgy Shpak, who became the sixteenth Russian Airborne Troops Commander-in-Chief a few years later, then Volga–Urals Military District Deputy Chief, assisted Khabarov in his transfer from the Carpathian Military District to the Urals.

After Col. Khabarov came back from Ukraine to Ural, he received an unusual assignment, a chair in military studies in the Ural State University in Yekaterinburg. The times were tough for military education.  A plethora of educational facilities had been closed, due to budget recissions and the chaotic situation which emerged following the Collapse of the Soviet Union. Khabarov embraced the challenge, and started to discover for himself a completely new military realm, i.e. the training of reserve officers.

Since the creation of reserve officer training facilities in the late 1920s, the prejudice exists, as to the quality of education, and skills, received by the cadets. The official objective of such education was to cross-train civil specialists, engineers and medics, in order to inculcate a set of supplementary military skills to their basic degree program. In fact it turned out to be a safe harbor for draft evaders, providing them with opportunity to dodge the mandatory active duty, and receive officer's rank as a plus. Military officers, which were appointed to lead such facilities, usually were not avid to turn the guided alma mater into a boot camp, and thus, the situation remained stale for decades, arousing skepticism among the active duty officers to their colleagues from military reserve. Ural was not the exception. Established in 1937 by Sovnarkom decree, Joint Military Chair of the Ural Industrial Institute haven′t experienced any significant changes for its semicentennial history.

Khabarov, using draconian measures, succeeded in turning his military chair into a high-profile educational facility, able to compete with conventional military schools and academies. Under his guidance, within a year, the chair has been promptly expanded to a Military Department, and then, after a decade of Khabarov's deanship, it branched off into a separate mil-tech educational facility (full name: Institute for Military Technical Education and Security, or IMTES.) He wrested T-72, T-80 and T-90 battle tanks from the Russian Ground Forces depots for the Institute's car park. He conducted a number of military exercises for his trainees, in cooperation with the Volga–Urals Military District Command. In 1996 Khabarov's reconnaissance sub-department has been visited by the servicemen of the U.S. Special Forces. Apart from training his cadets in scope of the conventional warfare tactics, he encouraged innovative scientific research among his subordinates, including a military robotics program, launched by the institute seniors, under his direct academic guidance.

The results were not long in coming. In 2003, Khabarov's outfit was considered to be the best educational facility in the entire Russian military. In 2004, he was regarded as the best military academic in the country. Khabarov's tankmen were noted as the best specialists in the Russian military, thrice in 1998, 2003 and 2005. Same did his “flaks” and “picks′n′shovels” in 2006. Institute hosted a number of conferences, visited by supreme military officials and heads of different military education facilities from across the country, and beyond.

Military awards and citations 

For his distinctive service, during the Afghan war, Khabarov has been awarded Order of the Red Banner, both classes of Medal “For Distinction in Military Service”, as well as all three classes of Medal “For Impeccable Service”, and Armed Forces of the USSR Veteran's Medal. After the fall of the Soviet Union he was awarded Order of Military Merit and several honorary titles, in recognition of his past exploits as actions, which had been done in the sake of Russia.

In 1980, just after he was assigned to Kabul, his subordinates, without informing him, sent a letter to Moscow, describing Khabarov actions while he was in charge of Salang and its neighboring area, and asking to award him Hero of the Soviet Union, the supreme Soviet military and civil award. The letter was submitted for consideration, but at the time it was received, Politburo denied any armed confrontation in Afghanistan, insisting that there was no such thing, which could be defined as war going on there. Thus Khabarov's nomination was suspended indefinitely, and he never received the Gold Star. After the USSR collapsed, this story received another boost. Sazhi Umalatova, a former Soviet parliamentarian, was elected Head of the Presidium of the Supreme Soviet of the USSR. The body was illegitimate by that time, but the new Russian authorities, led by Boris Yeltsin, were too weak to contest the powerful pro-communist sentiment, and forbade Umalatova's shadow government, who received wide support and got a lot of sympathizers among former apparatchiks, who still remained in power. Stripped from actual political power, Umalatova, in retaliation, claimed that the Yeltsin regime was illegitimate, and continued to create the illusion of Soviet life going on, including, distribution of Soviet-period awards. Apart from Soviet awards, the Presidium led by Umalatova, established their own medals and orders. After they found out that Khabarov was at the time nominated for Hero of the Soviet Union, they awarded him with “Veteran Internationalist Medal,” as an acknowledgement of his Afghan feats, and the “80 Years of the Soviet Armed Forces” Jubilee Medal, in recognition of a quarter century spent as an active duty soldier, and almost vicennial record of his service with the ROTC. Khabarov, as well as other veterans, accepted these awards, because during the years following the dissolution of the USSR, it was unclear who was in charge of the country. Many thought that the Union would be restored in a few years. Khabarov later commented on this dualism in his letter from Lefortovo State Prison: “I did serve political leaders. I served for the sake of the country — the Soviet Union — Russia — my Motherland.”

“Massoud? I would treat him like my best friend” 

Throughout the 1980s, during his deployment to Afghanistan, Khabarov and his men encountered Massoudi troops. Khabarov never found out who the lucky mujah was who shot him (if, of course, he survived the war). Khabarov was eager to know, just out of curiosity, because the man may have become a pretty rich fellow, since the Afghan insurgency priced Khabarov's life at Afs 500,000, as it was reported by the military intelligence plants, before he was shot in action.

Khabarov's bigger-than-life goal then was to find and capture Ahmad Shah Massoud, known as the Panjshir Lion, the informal leader of Afghan resistance. For that, Khabarov was later dispatched on his second tour of duty, but never faced Massoud personally.

While in hospital, Khabarov was asked what he would have done to his rival, Ahmad Shah Massoud, if he succeeded in capturing him. Khabarov replied that there was no chance a great warrior such as Massoud would allow himself to be captured by the Shuravi. He could be captured only by being killed or, wounded and bleeding and being in a near-death condition, without a slightest possibility to resist. In any case, even if he had captured Massoud, Khabarov said that he would treat him not like his fierce enemy, but rather his close ally, instead.

Back to Afghanistan 
In late February 2009, Col. Khabarov and two other veterans, 22nd Separate Spetsnaz Brigade Sgt. Victor Babenko, and 345th Guards Airborne Regiment Sgt. Maj. Evgeny Teterin, visited Islamic Republic of Afghanistan on a veterans′ tour across their service path. Together they visited Salang Pass, met the officer in charge of the place, who happened to be a Colonel General of the Afghan Army (while Khabarov was only a Captain in his time.) They moved all the way through the Panjshir mountains, where fierce battles of the 1980s once unfolded.

By the end of their journey, they visited Bazarak village in the Panjshir Valley, the burial place of Ahmad Shah Massoud. Never having met Massoud face to face, Khabarov asked his fellow companions to leave him alone for a minute: “Would you excuse us, guys. Ahmad and I wish to have a private chat.”

Post-retirement life 

In 2010, after almost 20 years of training reserve officers, Khabarov finally retired from service. In 2004 he was elected Deputy Chairman of the local organization of Afghan veterans. In his mid-sixties, Khabarov continued his public activity as a military supporter. Since a civilian functionary Anatoly Serdyukov stood at the head of the Russian Ministry of Defence, Khabarov was his staunch critic, publicly accusing him of sabotage and destruction of the Armed Forces. Khabarov said that Serdyukov, during his incumbency, succeeded in the destruction of the Russian Army so effectively, that the CIA could only dream about decades ago. He also referred to Serdyukov, not as a politician, but a state criminal, instead.

Arrest 

In 2011 Khabarov was arrested by Russian federal operatives. The FSB announced that Khabarov had planned a major upheaval on Airborne Troops Day, August 2, 2011. A search of his apartment revealed a custom-made sabre presented to Khabarov in the early 2000s by then Minister of Defence Sergei Ivanov, and an out-of-date promedol capsule from a soldier's medical kit Khabarov kept as a memento of his Afghan service in the 1980s. These artifacts were immediately submitted in a criminal case as evidence of his intentions. Along with the aforementioned, a copy of Dangerous By His Faithfulness To Russia, a '2006 book by Vladimir Kvachkov, was found in Khabarov's personal library. It was also submitted as material evidence in the case “extremist literature”, despite the book itself being freely available to buy and not listed on the Federal List of Extremist Materials. The opinion has been expressed quite frequently that Serdyukov and his henchmen were behind this arrest and the subsequent trial.

According to the ITAR-TASS news agency, the prosecution stated that Khabarov's group of "People's Militia named after Minin and Pozharsky" planned to launch an operation codenamed “Dawn” to overthrow official authorities in the region.

Backlash 

Many prominent figures in Russian politics expressed outrage about Khabarov's imprisonment. Among them are individuals with diametrically opposed political views such as the presidential candidates Leonid Ivashov and Gennady Zyuganov, as well as other political figures, such as Andrey Illarionov, Andrey Savelyev, Maxim Shevchenko, Alexey Dymovsky, Maxim Kalashnikov, Irek Murtazin, Mikhail Delyagin, Ashot Egiazaryan, Aleksandr Kharchikov, Dmitry Puchkov, et al. They said that the accusations do not hold water, pointing to the ridiculousness of the collected “evidence” against Khabarov. Khabarov's colleague, Col. Vladislav Zyomkovsky, said during an interview with PublicPost, that officially announced denunciation of a failed masterplan doesn′t stand up to critical examination, and if examined, the argument simply falls to the ground. In his opinion, a brilliant military strategist such as Khabarov, would never develop such an obvious plan. To refute the official version of the failed plot, Zyomkovsky cited one paragraph from Khabarov's bill of indictment, which states that Khabarov and his alleged accomplices planned to switch off the entire region's electrical grid, and thus create panic and civil disorder. In his opinion, this passage was copypasted from an indictment of the criminal trials of the 1930s, when such an event would really have spread chaos. But in the 2000s in Russia, electrical outages happened on a daily basis, were routine and a quite common occurrence.

Family 

Being a third-generation military man, with his father, and grandfather, both military officers, Khabarov decided to continue the family tradition. He received various assignments to remote places in the Soviet Union. His wife and two sons followed him on his postings. His sons, growing up as military brats, both have followed their father's pathway and, despite their mother's protest, they both enrolled in the Ryazan Airborne School, one after another.

Vitaly, the eldest son (born 1975) after graduating the airborne school in the mid-1990s, was assigned to serve with 106th Guards Airborne Division, spent his tour of duty in Chechnya, engaging in the First Russo-Chechen Conflict, and is serving until now at the rank of Lt. Colonel, as the Chief-of-staff with 242nd Airborne Training Center, Omsk.

Dmitry, the youngest son (born 1978), after graduating from airborne school in the late 1990s, volunteered to engage in the Chechen war on terror. As the CO of a recon platoon, Khabarov Jr, managed to locate and destroy two training facilities of the Chechen insurgency, intercepted and captured a major reinforcement of mercs and mujahs from various Arab states, on their way to join the rebel army, set up in the air two arms&ammo depots, and achieved several minor successes, having none of his men killed or badly wounded, while proceeding over the missions. Until one day, on his way back to compound, he was blown up by a land mine. Near dead, he was carried by his subordinates to their army base, and from there, he was evacuated by a helicopter to Mozdok, Republic of North Ossetia–Alania, and then to Moscow, where he was stationed in the same military hospital his father had been moved to, 20 years previously. He was lucky to survive, and have both his legs spared by army surgeons. After his recovery, he planned to go back into action, but the military refused to have him back in service, honorary discharging him in the rank of Major, instead.

Footnotes 
  Ryazan Airborne School is a still functioning four-year study facility, established on August 2, 1941, which brought up commanding officers and para specialists for military and civil organizations and agencies, such as: the Soviet Airborne Troops, and the Air Assault Troops (DShV,) airborne reconnaissance units of the Soviet Ground Forces, and Soviet Tank Corps, air assault units of the Soviet Naval Infantry, SAR-teams of the Soviet Air Forces, spetsnaz units of the Main Intelligence Directorate (GRU), and special anti-terrorist units of the Committee for State Security (KGB). Along with the Russian-speaking cadets, Ryazan Airborne School brought up Eastern European, South American, Caribbean, African and Asian students from the friendly socialist countries, and liberation movements. Most renowned alumni of the school are: Levan Sharashenidze, former Defense Minister of Georgia; Wojciech Jaruzelski, the last Communist leader of Poland from 1981 to 1989; and Amadou Toumani Touré, President of Mali from 2002 to 2012.
  Salang Pass and the tunnel underneath is a high-risk military object, which could be paralyzed by a smoke grenade. An eighty eight hundred feet long, extremely narrow, with no ventilation apertures, giant tunnel could be smoked out in a matter of seconds. There were several lethal incidents during the Soviet military campaign in Afghanistan, in which personnel of the Soviet supply convoys were choked by the carbon monoxide containing in diesel exhaust, when the head truck got stuck at one of the tunnel's ends (see Salang Tunnel fire.) It has also been known for the deadly avalanches, which struck it time after time (see Salang avalanches.) However, while Khabarov was in charge of the Salang and its surroundings, there were no casualties from the Soviet side.
  Shuravi or Shouravi is a Parsi word, which stands for “Soviets.” Contrary to other derogatory terms (e.g. yankees,) the term itself bears no negative connotation, and has been used by both, the Afghans, and Soviet militarymen in Afghanistan, referring to themselves as to Shuravi. Various terms were coined from the Afghans′ everyday language, such as Salam (short for “Peace, man!”) Bacha (which means “Buddy”) etc.
  Vasily Khabarov, was a Red Army officer, and a World War II veteran, a Red Banner, and Red Star recipient. His latter assignment was a Regiment Chief-of-staff; Stepan Khabarov, was a Russian Imperial Army officer, a St. George Cross cavalier, and veteran of Russo-Japanese War, World War I, and Russian Civil War in Siberia and the Far East. His latter assignment was a Regiment Commander.

References

External links 

 YEKATERINBURG, May 21, 2012: Court to consider issue of trial of Kvachkov's alleged accomplice ITAR-TASS
 CAUCASUS, October 17, 2011: Ferment in Russian army. Could Putin's clique of thieves be overthrown under Egyptian scenario? Kavkaz Center

Frunze Military Academy alumni
People from Shadrinsk
Prisoners and detainees of Russia
Recipients of the Order of the Red Banner
Recipients of the Order of Military Merit (Russia)
Russian skydivers
Academic staff of Ural Federal University
Russian military personnel
Russian mountain climbers
Heads of schools in Russia
Russian rebels
Soviet military personnel of the Soviet–Afghan War
Soviet mountain climbers
1947 births
Living people
Russian male boxers
Inmates of Lefortovo Prison
20th-century Russian educators
Ryazan Guards Higher Airborne Command School alumni